Checkers is a 1937 American drama film directed by H. Bruce Humberstone and written by Robert Chapin, Karen DeWolf, Frank Fenton and Lynn Root. The film stars Jane Withers, Stuart Erwin, Una Merkel, Marvin Stephens, Andrew Tombes and June Carlson. The film was released on December 8, 1937, by 20th Century Fox.

Plot
A veterinarian repairs a horse's leg so the animal can run in a big race and save a man's farm.

Cast   
Jane Withers as Checkers
Stuart Erwin as Edgar Connell
Una Merkel as Mamie Appleby
Marvin Stephens as Jimmy Somers
Andrew Tombes as Tobias Somers
June Carlson as Sarah Williams
Minor Watson as Dr. Smith
John Harrington as Mr. Green
Spencer Charters as Zeb
Francis Ford as Daniel Snodgrass

References

External links
 

1937 films
20th Century Fox films
American drama films
1937 drama films
Films directed by H. Bruce Humberstone
American black-and-white films
1930s English-language films
1930s American films